Lemona is a village in the Paphos District of Cyprus, located about 25 km northeast of the town of Paphos and 7 km west of Agios Fotios.

It may have taken its name at old times from many stagnant waters that existed in the area or from many lemon trees in the area. The main occupation of the former inhabitants was agriculture. The village school closed in 1987. Lemona Village is close to Choulou, Kourdaka and Letymvou villages.

Built at an elevation of 300 and watered by the river Ezousa, the Lemona village of about 50 inhabitants constitutes an impasse, as the road from there does not lead to another village. In addition the settlement is a hunting site during the hunting season.

References

Communities in Paphos District